The Journal of Mammalian Evolution is the official journal of the Society for the Study of Mammalian Evolution. The journal is  peer-reviewed  Bi-monthly is a multidisciplinary forum devoted to studies on the comparative morphology, molecular biology, paleobiology, genetics, developmental and reproductive biology, biogeography, systematics, ethology and ecology, and population dynamics of mammals and the ways that these diverse data can be analyzed for the reconstruction of mammalian evolution. According to the Journal Citation Reports, the journal has a 2014 impact factor of 2.357.

References

English-language journals